is a Japanese Paralympic judoka in Super-Heavyweight.

In 2012 he became Paralympic champion in the +100 kg by beating Song Wang (China) in the final.

The 2016 Summer Paralympics in Rio was Masaki's second appearance at the Games. Competing in the +100 kg category, he secured his second Paralympic medal with a bronze However, he faced a setback in the semi-final when he had his first-ever defeat in a Paralympic match to Adiljan Tuledibaev of Uzbekistan. Tuledibaev went on to win the gold medal, while Masaki ultimately won the bronze-medal match.

References

Paralympic judoka of Japan
Judoka at the 2012 Summer Paralympics
Judoka at the 2016 Summer Paralympics
Paralympic gold medalists for Japan
Paralympic bronze medalists for Japan
Living people
1987 births
Japanese male judoka
Medalists at the 2012 Summer Paralympics
Medalists at the 2016 Summer Paralympics
Paralympic medalists in judo
21st-century Japanese people